Marc Howard may refer to:

 Marc Howard (news anchor) (born 1937), retired Philadelphia news anchor
 Marc Morjé Howard, Professor of Government at Georgetown University, author and prison reformer

See also
Mark Howard (disambiguation)